The Civic Party of Montenegro was a minor liberal political party in Montenegro.

History
In the 2006 parliamentary election in Montenegro, the party did not manage to win a seat in Montenegrin Parliament. The party and its leader were active in promoting Montenegro's independence prior to Montenegrin independence referendum, along with the DPS, SDP, DUA, LP and others.

After Civic Party's failure to gain any seats in Parliament in the 2006 parliamentary election, its leader Krsto Pavićević resigned from the position of the party's president, along with two vice presidents, Petar Bokan and Slobodan Medenica. Until the next party congress, Civic Party of Montenegro was led by the team of coordinators which consisted of its prominent members, Džoni Hodžić, Milorad Dapčević, Neđeljko Đurović and Davor Klasić. After its lack of electoral success at the 2010 local elections, the party ceased its further activity.

The party remained formally registered until December 2017, when it was formally deleted from the Register of Political Parties.

Electoral results

Parliamentary elections

References

2002 establishments in Montenegro
Defunct political parties in Montenegro
Liberal parties in Montenegro
Political parties disestablished in 2010
Political parties established in 2002
Pro-European political parties in Montenegro